City of Vultures is the first and only studio album by the British metal band Rise to Remain. It was released on 5 September 2011 through EMI Records, and in the United States on 5 June 2012 through Century Media Records. It debuted at #83 on the UK Album Charts and at No. 3 UK Rock Chart as well as No. 10 on the International Top 12 Charts in India.

Recording
City of Vultures was recorded over the course of four months, beginning in July 2010 at Chapel Studios in Lincolnshire, UK, and concluding in November 2010 Treehouse Studios in Chesterfield, UK. Colin Richardson, in his first production effort since Bullet for My Valentine's 2008 album "Scream Aim Fire", produced the album along with co-producer Carl Bown. It is the band's first release with EMI, whom they signed with in March 2011 after the subsequent completion of the album in November of the previous year. It features two songs from their EP, Bridges Will Burn: "Nothing Left" and "Bridges Will Burn". In July 2011, Kerrang! magazine hosted a complete album playback for 5 competition winners, prior to the album's release in September. From 15:00 (UTC +1) on 29 August, Rise to Remain made the entire album available for streaming for 24 hours, one week before the album's release.

Critical reception

The album has received very strong acclaim within music publications. Kerrang! Magazine awarded the album 4/5, Metal Hammer 8/10, Q Magazine 8/10, Big Cheese 4/5, Rocksound 8/10, Powerplay 8/10 and Front Magazine gave the album a full 5/5. Tracks such as "Power Through Fear" and "Nothing Left" have received rotation on BBC Radio 1 and XFM, courtesy of Fearne Cotton, Daniel P Carter and Zane Lowe, who have all highly praised the songs and the album itself. The more ambiguous reviews came in from publications such as The Guardian, which gave the album 3/5, as well as Allmusic, which claimed that "The band appears unwilling to deviate from its intense guitar-shredding formula, meaning the album begins to run out of steam well before the rather brutal finale, "Bridges Will Burn," draws to a close.".

Chart positions
Album

Track listing
All music by Rise to Remain, all lyrics by Austin Dickinson.

Personnel

Rise to Remain
 Austin Dickinson – lead vocals
 Pat Lundy – drums
 Ben Tovey – lead guitar
 Will Homer – rhythm guitar
 Joe Copcutt  – bass guitar
 Michael Pitman – drums (On tracks 13-16)

Production
 Colin Richardson – production, mix
 Carl Bown – co-production, engineering, mix
 Ted Jensen – mastering
 Dan Weller – production, bass (on North American release bonus tracks)
 Tim Morris – engineering (on North American release bonus tracks)

References

2011 debut albums
Rise to Remain albums
Century Media Records albums
EMI Records albums
Albums produced by Colin Richardson
Albums produced by Dan Weller